European Football Coach of the Season was an annual prize in association football awarded to the best manager of European football club in an autumn-spring season, organized by European Union of Sports Press (fr. Union européenne de la presse sportive (UEPS), also known as AIPS Europe) since the 2006–07 season. The prize was previously awarded by the Association of European Journalists (AEJ, 1977–78 to 1996–97) and UEFA (1997–98 to 2005–06).

Winners

Total wins by coaches

Total wins by country

See also
UEFA Men's Coach of the Year Award
South American Coach of the Year
European Coach of the Year
UEFA Club Football Awards

References

Sources 
 Newspaper "Ukrainian Football", 27 December 2016, No.89—90

Euro
European football trophies and awards
Awards established in 1978